China–Spain relations have existed since the 16th century. Relations between Spain and the People's Republic of China were established in 1973. Spain has adhered to the One-China policy that it recognizes the PRC as the sole legitimate government of China and does not recognize the legitimacy of the Republic of China on Taiwan.

History
Contact between China and Spain first occurred between the Ming dynasty of China and the Spanish-ruled Philippines.

Spain fantasised taking over China.

When the Chinese pirate Limahong attacked Manila in 1574, officials in Fujian Province were willing to let the Spanish establish a trade port on an island south of Xiamen, in return for Limahong's capture. However, the governor of the Philippines did not respond favourably, and the offer came to nothing when Limahong escaped from Manila.

In 1598, Cantonese officials allowed Spain to trade in El Piñal, a port in the Pearl River Delta near Macau. The Portuguese in Macau reacted violently and chased away the Spanish from the area by arms in 1600.

The Qing dynasty and Spain had diplomatic relations.

In 1927, a treaty recognising extraterritoriality was signed between the Kingdom of Spain and Chiang Kai-shek's Nationalist government. The Spanish consul general in Shanghai was also the minister plenipotentiary to China. The Republic of China had diplomatic relations with Spain under Francisco Franco.

Francoist Spain's relations with the People's Republic of China began in 1973 after both countries were still reeling from the aftermath of civil wars.

Bilateral relations
The volume of trade between the two countries has grown considerably in recent years. Total trade, at US$7.2 billion in 2004, had increased to $22.7 billion by October 2008.

Relations have gradually improved, with official state visits and various exchanges. Spain hosted Expo 2008, with China being a participant, and China hosted Expo 2010 in which Spain had a pavilion.
As a consequence, China has become Spain's sixth-largest trading partner.

Spain held the rotating EU presidency from Jan 1 to June 30, 2010, and it indicated that it would support a lift in the EU arms embargo to boost two-way trade because in 2008, China's exports to the EU were 248 billion euros ($357 billion), but imports were only 78 billion euros.  This could improve trade between the EU and China by allowing China to import higher technology goods for which the Europeans are known.

In June 2019, Spain had extradited 94 Taiwanese nationals to Mainland China as part of "Operation Great Wall" instead of Taiwan. Both countries signed an extradition agreement in 2006.

The next month, the UN ambassadors from 22 nations, including Spain, signed a joint letter to the UNHRC condemning China's alleged mistreatment of the Uyghurs as well as of other minority groups and urged the Chinese government to close the Xinjiang re-education camps.

Trade
While most cargoes are shipped between China and Europe (including Spain) by sea, there are direct container trains running from Yiwu (Zhejiang Province) to Madrid as well.

During the Coronavirus crisis it was reported in April 2020, that 640,000 Antigen Coronavirus Test Kits which themselves were replacements for previously supplied faulty kits, bought from a Chinese company 'Bioeasy' had been found to be defective, prompting Spain to seek a refund. The Spanish Health Ministry reported that faulty face masks bought from another Chinese company 'Garry Galaxy' had resulted in infections among health workers, requiring the isolation of over a thousand Spanish healthcare personnel.

Resident diplomatic missions
 China has an embassy in Madrid and a consulate-general in Barcelona.
 Spain has an embassy in Beijing and consulates-general in Guangzhou, Hong Kong and Shanghai.

See also
Foreign relations of China
Foreign relations of Spain
Chinese people in Spain

References

External links
Spanish Embassy in Beijing, China 
Embajada de la República Popular China en España 
Chinese Embassy in Madrid,Spain 

 
Spain
China